The King Faisal Prize (formerly King Faisal International Prize), is an annual award sponsored by King Faisal Foundation presented to "dedicated men and women whose contributions make a positive difference".  The foundation awards prizes in five categories: Service to Islam; Islamic studies; the Arabic language and Arabic literature; science; and medicine. Three of the prizes are widely considered to be the most prestigious awards in the Muslim world.

The first King Faisal Prize was awarded to the Pakistani scholar Abul A'la Maududi in 1979 for his service to Islam. In 1981, Khalid of Saudi Arabia received the same award.  In 1984, Fahd of Saudi Arabia was the recipient of the award. In 1986, this prize was co-awarded to Ahmed Deedat and French Roger Garaudy.

Award process

Designation of subjects

Each year, the selection committees designate subjects in Islamic Studies, Arabic Literature, and Medicine. Selected topics in Islamic Studies category are aimed at highlighting areas of importance in Muslim societies. Arabic Literature  topics relate to specialized areas within the discipline. Topics in medicine are supposed to reflect current areas of international concern. The science category covers a broad range of subcategories e.g. physics, mathematics, chemistry and biology.

Nomination 

Islamic institutions, universities and previous winners of the King Faisal Prize can nominate a person for the award. Nominations from ordinary individuals or political parties are not accepted. The nominee or nominated institution(s) must be known for their leading practical or intellectual role in the service of Islam and Muslims. Nominated works must be published, benefit mankind and enrich human knowledge.

Selection

Winners of the Prize for category "Service to Islam" are chosen directly by the respective selection committee. For other Prize categories, pre-selection by peer reviewers is carried out, which is followed by scrutiny of the works of worthy nominees by selected referees of each discipline. Autonomous, international, specialist selection committees are then convened at the headquarters of King Faisal Foundation in Riyadh each January to make their final decisions.

Prizes
The prize in each of the five categories consists of:
 A Certificate written in Arabic Diwani calligraphy and signed by the Chairman of the Prize board, His Royal Highness Prince Khalid Al-Faisal Bin Abd Al-Aziz, enclosed in a binder of the finest leather inscribed with the winner’s name and a summary of his/her work which qualified him/her for the prize.
 A 24 carat 200 gram gold medal, with one side bearing the image of King Faisal, and the prize category written in Arabic, and the other holding the logo of the prize and the prize category in English.
 A check of SAR 750 thousand (an equivalent of US$ 200 thousand), distributed equally between the winners if they are more than one.

Co-winners in any category share the monetary grant. The prizes are awarded during a ceremony in Riyadh, Saudi Arabia, under the auspices of the King of Saudi Arabia.

Country standings
The five countries with most award-winners 2022 were:

Sydney Brenner was considered to be the first Jew to win the King Faisal Award, in 1992. Ronald Levy was reported to be a Jewish recipient in 2009.

Winners by subject

Service to Islam

Islamic Studies world wide

Arabic language and literature

Medicine

Science

See also 
 List of general science and technology awards 
 List of religion-related awards
 List of things named after Saudi Kings
 Muhammad VI Awards for the Holy Quran

References

External links
 Official Website of King Faisal Prize
 Complete List of All-time Winners of King Faisal Award
 PDF: Official Archive of all-time winners
 King Faisal Awards 2014
 Rays of Light and Brightness: The King Faisal International Prize by Peter Harrigan, Saudi Aramco World Magazine, Sep/Oct 2000, Vol 51, Nmbr 5

Religion-related awards
Science and technology awards
Saudi Arabian awards
1979 establishments in Saudi Arabia
International awards
Saudi Arabian literary awards
Islamic awards